Desmond Hillary O'Donnell (7 October 1921 – 18 January 1992) was a New Zealand rugby union player. A prop, O'Donnell represented Wellington at a provincial level from 1945 to 1951. He played for the New Zealand national side, the All Blacks, in one match, the second test against the touring Australian team in 1949.

References

1921 births
1992 deaths
Rugby union players from Palmerston North
People educated at St. Patrick's College, Silverstream
New Zealand rugby union players
New Zealand international rugby union players
Wellington rugby union players
Rugby union props